Mira Mar Sport Clube  (known as Mira Mar SC or Mira Mar), is a Portuguese football club based in Povoação on the island of São Miguel in the Azores.

Background
Mira Mar SC currently plays in the AF Ponta Delgada 1ª Divisão (known as the Campeonato de S. Miguel) which is the fifth tier of Portuguese football. The club was founded in 1935 and they play their home matches at the Complexo Desportivo Municipal da Povoação in Povoação. The stadium is able to accommodate 1,000 spectators.

The club is affiliated to Associação de Futebol de Ponta Delgada and has competed in the AF Ponta Delgada Taça. The club has also entered the national cup competition known as Taça de Portugal on a few occasions.

Season to season

Honours
AF Ponta Delgada Taça Primavera: 2010/11

References

Football clubs in Portugal
Football clubs in the Azores
Association football clubs established in 1935
1935 establishments in Portugal
Football clubs in São Miguel Island
Povoação, Azores